Small Axe is a British anthology film series, created and directed by Steve McQueen. The anthology consists of five films that tell distinct stories about the lives of West Indian immigrants in London from the 1960s to the 1980s. Two episodes of the series were selected into the 2020 Cannes Film Festival. The series premiered on 15 November 2020 on BBC One in the United Kingdom and on 20 November 2020 on Amazon Prime Video in the United States. The title references a proverb – "Small axe fall big tree" or "If you are the big tree, we are the small axe" – that was popularised by Bob Marley in his 1973 song "Small Axe".

Films

Production

Development
It has been reported that Steve McQueen began working on the idea for Small Axe in 2010, and that some form of the series was in development since 2012. While the series was initially conceived as a conventional television series with a serialized story, McQueen realized during development that he had sufficient material to make several distinct films. In January 2014, it was announced that he would write and direct an untitled television series for either BBC One or BBC Two about the experience of black people in Britain. In August 2015, it was announced that the series would air on BBC One. In June 2019, Amazon Prime Video was announced to be distributing the series in the United States, with Amazon Studios co-producing. The screenwriters include the British-Caribbean novelist Courttia Newland (author of The Gospel According to Cane, 2013) and Alastair Siddons.

Casting
In June 2019, it was announced that Letitia Wright, John Boyega, Malachi Kirby, Shaun Parkes, Rochenda Sandall, Alex Jennings, and Jack Lowden had joined the cast of the series. In January 2020, Micheal Ward joined the cast of the series.

Release
Lovers Rock had its world premiere as the opener of the 58th New York Film Festival on 17 September 2020. Mangrove had its world premiere at the festival on 25 September, and Red, White, and Blue on 3 October. Mangrove also opened the 64th BFI London Film Festival on 7 October 2020; Lovers Rock screened at the same festival on 18 October.

The series premiered in the UK on BBC One on 15 November 2020 and in the United States on Amazon Prime Video on 20 November 2020, with one episode released per week on both platforms.

The series will receive a Blu-Ray release by The Criterion Collection on April 25, 2023. The release includes the five films, plus interviews and conversations with director Steve McQueen and cast/crew members, the 2021 documentary Uprising (codirected by McQueen and James Rogan), trailers, and an essay by Ashley Clark. https://www.criterion.com/boxsets/6517-small-axe

Reception

Critical response
Critical press reviews of each individual film were positive. All five films received approval ratings of at least 95% on the review aggregator website Rotten Tomatoes, while Metacritic assigned four of the five a score indicating "universal acclaim".

Lovers Rock, in particular, was named the best film of 2020 by the British film magazine Sight & Sound in its poll of 104 critics worldwide; Mangrove came in at 13th.

Accolades

References

External links
"These are the untold stories that make up our nation": Steve McQueen on Small Axe, David Olusoga's interview with Steve McQueen about Small Axe, in Sight & Sound, 13 November 2020.

 at Amazon Prime Video

2020 British television series debuts
2020 British television series endings
2020s British anthology television series
Afro-Caribbean culture in London
BBC television dramas
Black British cinema
Black British history
English-language television shows
Cultural depictions of Metropolitan Police officers